Hymenaeus (fl. 50–65, 1 Timothy 1:20, 2 Timothy 2:17) was an early Christian from Ephesus, an opponent of the apostle Paul, who associates him with Alexander and Philetus.

Biblical accounts
In 1 Timothy 1:20, Hymenaeus is included in the "some" who had put away faith and a good conscience and who had made shipwreck concerning faith. The apostle adds that he had delivered Hymenaeus and Alexander to Satan, that they might learn not to blaspheme.

Denial of the resurrection
Hymenaeus and Philetus are included among persons whose profane and vain babblings will increase towards more ungodliness, and whose teaching "will spread as a cancer" ( NLT). The apostle declares that Hymenaeus and Philetus are examples of those just described, and he adds that those two persons "concerning the truth have erred, saying that the resurrection is past already, and overthrow the faith of some." Then, for the guidance of Timothy, he goes on to say the seal upon the foundation of God is, "The LORD knows those who are his,” and “All who belong to the LORD must turn away from evil" ( NLT).

The inference intended is, that though Hymenaeus and Philetus had professed their faith in Christ, they did not turn away from evil. There is no doubt in regard to the identity of this Hymenaeus with the person of the same name in 1 Timothy. Accordingly, the facts mentioned in the two epistles must be placed in the following order: That though Hymenaeus had, 
made a public and Christian profession of faith in Christ, yet he had, 
not turned away from evil, but by his profane teaching (see below), 
went towards more ungodliness. This led to, 
his abandoning his faith and a good conscience, thus he brought about, 
the end result of his faith being shipwrecked.

The error, therefore, of Hymenaeus and his two companions would amount to this: They taught that "the resurrection is past already," circa 50AD–65AD, and that there would be no future resurrection, but that all that resurrection means is that the soul awakes from sin. This teaching of Hymenaeus had been so far successful: it had "overthrown the faith of some".

In another sense, the error is that there is no resurrection of the mortal body from the dead. What Hymenaeus may have been teaching is a current error among professing Christians today, that the resurrection is with an entirely different and spiritual immortal body, than we have on earth. And that new spiritual body is already 'resurrected' for us by god and received. They believe born again Christians are therefore raised up to sit in heavenly places  with their newly resurrected spiritual bodies. The conclusion is that the new man cannot spiritually die anymore, even if doing evil in the flesh. To wit, There is now no more condemnation for unrighteous, while doing unrighteousness.  The deliverance of Christ and grace is not from sinning with the flesh, but is only from judgment and condemnation for doing so. It, therefore, overthrows the faith by increased ungodliness, as though the new man has become 'untouchable' in heaven. There is no more need to abstain from fornication, so far as being accepted of the Lord. There is no need to keep the new man from filthiness of the flesh, because the new man is already forever resurrected from the dead: The resurrection is past. It is a kind of New Age Christianity, where the serpent's promise of being as immortal gods in heaven, has finally come to pass, because the resurrection is past.

Incipient Gnosticism
It is impossible to define exactly the full nature of this heresy, but from what Paul says regarding it, Hymenaeus and Philetus may have believed in an early form of the Christian heresy of Gnosticism. This awakening from Sin had taken place with themselves, so the Gnostics held, and therefore there could be no day in the future when the dead shall hear the voice of the Son of God and shall come forth from the grave.

This spiritualizing of the resurrection sprang from the idea of the necessarily evil nature of all material substance. This idea immediately led to the conclusion of the essentially evil nature of the human body, and that if man is to rise to his true nature, he must rid himself of the thraldom, not of sin, but of the body. This contempt for the body led to the denial of the resurrection in its literal sense; and all that Christ had taught on the subject was explained only, in an allegorical sense, of the resurrection of the soul from sin.

Delivered unto Satan
The way in which the apostle dealt with these teachers, Hymenaeus and his companions, was not merely in the renewed assertion of the truth which they denied, but also by passing sentence upon these teachers—"whom I delivered unto Satan, that they might be taught not to blaspheme." In regard to the meaning of this sentence much difficulty of interpretation exists. Some understand it to mean simple excommunication from the church. Others take it to signify the infliction of some bodily suffering or disease. It seems that a person who was delivered unto Satan was cut off from all Christian privileges, he was "put away" from the body of Christian believers, and handed over to "the Satan," the Evil One in his most distinct personality (1 Corinthians 5). Cf. the cases of Ananias and Sapphira (Acts 5), and of Elymas.

The intention of the punishment was distinctly remedial. Both in the case of Hymenaeus and Alexander, and in that of the person dealt with in 1 Corinthians 5, the intention was the attaining of an ultimate good. In 1 Corinthians it is "for the destruction of the flesh, that the spirit may be saved in the day of the Lord Jesus." Similarly, Hymenaeus and Alexander are delivered unto Satan, not for their final perdition, but that they may be taught, through this terrible discipline, not to blaspheme.

Notes

Bibliography
Attribution

People in the Pauline epistles
Year of birth unknown
Year of death unknown
First Epistle to Timothy